Norman Aubrey Beckton (4 May 1898 – 8 September 1984) was an Australian rules footballer who played with Essendon in the VFL during the 1920s.

Football
Beckton played as a ruckman and won Essendon's best and fairest in 1928. A premiership player in 1923 and 1924, Beckton also represented Victoria during his career. He captained Essendon in 1929 and 1930.

Notes

References
 Australia's Biggest Footballer: Who can claim the distinction?: Beckton -- The Man and His Physique, The Sporting Globe, (Wednesday, 2 June 1926), p.1.
 Maplestone, M., Flying Higher: History of the Essendon Football Club 1872–1996, Essendon Football Club, (Melbourne), 1996.

External links
 
 Norm Beckton at Boyles Football Photos.
 Profile at Essendonfc.com

1898 births
1984 deaths
Australian rules footballers from Melbourne
Australian Rules footballers: place kick exponents
Essendon Football Club players
Essendon Football Club Premiership players
Sandringham Football Club players
Sandringham Football Club coaches
Essendon Association Football Club players
Crichton Medal winners
Australian military personnel of World War I
Two-time VFL/AFL Premiership players
People from Brunswick, Victoria
Military personnel from Melbourne